Nearly Famous is a television drama mini-series about a group of British teenagers at a top London school of the performing arts. It is shown in the UK and Ireland on E4. The show has been compared to other teen drama series such as The O.C. and Skins. The show debuted on E4 on 8 November 2007 and ended its run on 13 December 2007. It is filmed in Kent, England.

Synopsis
The six part series follows Lila (Talulah Riley), an awkward 19-year-old with a mentally ill mother, but with an exceptional talent for writing; Owen (Aaron Johnson), who can not read music any more than he can rewrite his wayward past; Joe, (Tunji Kasim) a nice guy with a talent doing light and sound, who is a bit of a nerd; and Kate (Anna Brewster) a beautiful, ambitious actress, who is sick of living in the shadow of her successful film director dad. Over the six-week series, the world of this unlikely group of friends is explored.

Characters
Aaron Johnson as Owen Stephens – A talented musician with a past that seems to haunt him.
Talulah Riley as Lila Reed – A writer with a heart. Her mother has a mental health condition and does not want to let go of her daughter.
Tunji Kasim as Joe Bailey – Misunderstood technology geek from a tough background who wants to achieve something in life
Anna Brewster as Kate Sherman – An actress striving to receive recognition of her own talents without the help of her famous father.
Jimi Mistry as Matt Bright – Music teacher who has a long and complicated history with Jen. He has hopes to make it big in the music industry.
Rebecca Palmer as Jen Bracken – Writing teacher with marital problems. Matt is her only means of support.
Lizzy McInnerny as Rita Rocheman – Dance teacher who has a history with Dominic.
Ralph Brown as Dominic Soloman – Drama teacher and principal of the Salinger School

Other Cast
Ella Jones as Sarah
Anna McAuley as Henri
Max Gell as Cal Redmond
Rosalind Halstead as Kelly Short
Gregg Chillin as Ash Chopra
Gina Bellman as Traci Reed
Nicolas Woodman as Jamie

Soundtrack
 Incidental music by Simon Boswell
 Original songs by Joe Boswell
 "Love Will Tear Us Apart" by Joy Division
 "Hallelujah" by Leonard Cohen
Choreographed by Caroline Pope.

References

External links 
 

2007 British television series debuts
British teen drama television series
2000s British drama television series
Channel 4 original programming
2007 British television series endings
Television shows set in England
Television series about teenagers
2000s British television miniseries